Abrigo is a Spanish language surname meaning "coat". Notable people with the surname include:

 Joe Abrigo (born 1995), Chilean footballer
 Miguel Abrigo (born 1974), Argentine footballer

References 

Spanish-language surnames